Muhammad Ali fought two boxing matches with George Chuvalo. The first bout took place on March 29, 1966; and the second on May 1, 1972. Ali won both fights through unanimous decisions on points.

The 1966 fight was the subject of Joseph Blasioli's 2003 documentary film The Last Round: Chuvalo vs. Ali.

References

Chuvalo
1966 in boxing
1972 in boxing
World Boxing Council heavyweight championship matches
March 1966 sports events
May 1972 sports events